Dagva Enkhtaivan (born 26 November 1982) is a Mongolian international footballer. He made his first appearance for the Mongolia national football team in 2007.

References

1982 births
Mongolian footballers
Mongolia international footballers
Living people
Association football forwards